Diadelia guineensis is a species of beetle in the family Cerambycidae. It was described by Baguena Corella and Breuning in 1958.

References

Diadelia
Beetles described in 1958